James Vernon (31 March 1942 – 17 September 2014) was an amateur Scottish footballer who played in the Scottish League for Queen's Park as a full back. He was capped by Scotland at amateur level.

References 

Scottish footballers
Scottish Football League players
Queen's Park F.C. players
Association football fullbacks
Scotland amateur international footballers
Clyde F.C. players

1942 births
2014 deaths
Footballers from Kilmarnock